The Altan Khans (lit. Golden Khan) ruled north-western Mongolia from about 1609 to 1691 at the latest. Altan Khan of Khalkha also known as Altan Khan of Khotogoid ruled over the Khotogoids in northwestern Mongolia and  belonged to the Left Wing of the Khalkha (Eastern) Mongols. Although they claimed to be Khan, Mongolian chronicles call them Hun Taij, which was a 
noble rank equivalent to prince.

Background
After the death of Dayan Khan some time after 1517 his empire was split between his descendants and became a kind of family federation. His grandson, a different Altan Khan (1507–1582) of Tumet had successful military campaigns against the Oirats. Dayan Khan's youngest son, Gersendze Huangtaizi, was given lands approximately matching the territory of present-day Mongolia. By the early 17th century most of Outer Mongolia was held by his descendants. These formed four khanates, from west to east:
 The Altan Khan (great-grandson of Geresandza) in the far west.
 Dzasagtu-khan, khanate founded by Laikhor-khan, a cousin of the Altan Khan.
 Tushetu Khan at örgöö (/, today Ulan Bator) founded by Abtai Sain Khan, another grandson. This was the senior branch.
 Sechen-khan at the eastern end of modern Mongolia, founded by Shului, a great-grandson.

The Altan Khan was important circa 1609-1682. The Tushetu Khan, with his control of the religious capital, was long the leading figure in Khalkha.

In the 17th century, to the west, the Oirat Dzungar Khanate was gradually consolidated in modern-day Xinjiang; to the north, the Russians increased their hold over the Siberian forests; and, to the east, the Manchus moved south to conquer the Ming dynasty, eventually forming the Qing dynasty.

Rulers
 Ubasi Khong Tayiji (Shului Ubasha Khong Tayiji) (?-1623) was the first to take the name Altan Khan. Ubasi was killed by the Oirats in 1623 and was succeeded by his son Badma Erdeni Khong Tayiji.
 Badma Erdeni Khong Tayiji (1623-?) his son. In 1652, he abdicated the throne and his son Erinchin Lobsang Tayiji succeeded.
 Erinchin Lobsang Tayiji (or Lobdzang or Rinchen Sayin Khong Tayiji) (ca.1658-91): In 1662 he attacked, captured and put to death his eastern neighbor, the Dzasagtu Khan. This led the senior Tushetu Khan (Chaghun Dorji) to form a league and drive out the Altan-khan. With the help of the Dzungar and Qing (divide and conquer), he was able to reinstate himself, but in 1682 he was captured by the Dzasagtu Khan. In 1691 he, and his khanate, disappeared from the records.

References
René Grousset, 'The Empire of the Steppes, 1970

17th-century Mongol rulers